Louis Rees-Zammit (born 2 February 2001) is a Welsh rugby union wing who currently plays for Gloucester in the English Premiership and for Wales at national level. In 2021, Rees-Zammit was selected to tour with the British and Irish Lions.

Early life
Rees-Zammit was born in Penarth, Vale of Glamorgan in Wales. He attended The Cathedral School, Llandaff and played rugby for the school.

Club career
Rees-Zammit started his youth career at Cardiff Blues, before moving to Hartpury College and from there to the academy of Gloucester Rugby.

He broke into the Gloucester senior team in the 2019–20 season, becoming the club's youngest ever Premiership player at 18 years and 70 days. Rees-Zammit would also become Gloucester's youngest European player and youngest European try scorer in 2019. He scored two tries against Worcester during a 36–3 win in December 2019, and later the same month became the first 18-year-old to score a hat-trick of tries during a 33–26 loss to Northampton. He received the Premiership Player of the Month Award in December 2019. Rees-Zammit ended his season with 15 tries in 21 appearances, including 10 tries in 10 Premiership starts.

On 13 January 2020, Rees-Zammit signed his first professional contract with Gloucester, securing him to the club on a long term deal.

Rees-Zammit ended the 2020-2021 season with a record of 11 tries in 20 games and was named Gloucester's Young Player of the Year.

Rees-Zammit made his first appearance of the 2021–22 Premiership scoring two tries in the Round 4 victory over Sale.

International career

Wales
Rees-Zammit represented Wales at under-18 level.

He received his first call up to the senior Wales squad, from coach Wayne Pivac, on 15 January 2020 for the 2020 Six Nations Championship. He made his debut for Wales, from the bench, in a test match against France held at Stade de France in Paris, France, in October 2020. Rees-Zammit scored his maiden test try against Georgia on 21 November 2020.

He scored his first 2021 Six Nations Championship try, on his Six Nations debut, in the Round 1 match against Ireland on 7 February 2021. On 13 February 2021, in the Six Nations match against Scotland, he scored two tries, including the winning try, and was named as man of the match. On 21 March, in the Round 5 Grand Slam decider, against France, Rees-Zammit had a try disallowed, following analysis by the TMO Wayne Barnes, when the ball was judged to have been grounded on the base of the corner flag.

British & Irish Lions
On 6 May 2021, Rees-Zammit was named in the squad for the 2021 British & Irish Lions tour to South Africa. Rees-Zammit's inclusion made him the youngest Lion selected since the 1959 Lions tour to Australia and New Zealand at the age of 20 years and 93 days. Rees-Zammit made his first Lions appearance in the tours opening provincial game against the Lions, scoring the opening try after 3 minutes. Rees-Zammit was then selected to play against the Sharks in the following game, again getting in the scoresheet as the Lions ran out 54–7 winners. Rees-Zammit would score as a replacement in the final provincial game of the tour on 17 July 2021 against the Stormers, taking his tour tally to 3 tries in 4 appearances.

International tries

Personal life
Rees-Zammit's paternal grandfather emigrated to London from Malta.

References

External links

 from GloucesterRugbyTV

2001 births
Living people
British people of Maltese descent
Gloucester Rugby players
People educated at The Cathedral School, Llandaff
Rugby union players from Penarth
Rugby union wings
Wales international rugby union players
Welsh rugby union players
British & Irish Lions rugby union players from Wales